Filip Polášek (born 21 July 1985) is an inactive Slovak professional tennis player who specialises in doubles. He reached his highest doubles ranking of world No. 7 in February 2020, and has won 17 titles on the ATP Tour.
He was forced to retire in 2013 due to health issues, but returned in 2018 and began the most successful phase of his career. Polášek won his first Grand Slam title at the 2021 Australian Open alongside Ivan Dodig, and also won the 2019 Cincinnati Masters and 2021 Indian Wells Masters, with Dodig and John Peers respectively. Polášek was the first Slovak man to reach, or win a major doubles final. He also reached the semifinals at the 2019 Wimbledon Championships, 2020 Australian Open and 2021 US Open. He qualified for the ATP Finals in both 2019 and 2021. Polášek has represented Slovakia in the Davis Cup since 2008, and also competed at the 2020 Summer Olympics partnering Lukáš Klein.

Career

2008: First ATP titles 
Polášek reached his first ATP final at the 2008 Valencia Open with partner Travis Parrott, they fell to Máximo González and Juan Mónaco in two tight sets 5–7, 5–7. Later that year at the Swiss Open Gsaad he won his first title with partner Jaroslav Levinský in three sets. In October Polášek won his second title of the year at the St. Petersburg Open with Travis Parrott.

2013: Retirement due to injury 
In 2013 Polášek reached three ATP finals with partner Julian Knowle, winning the later two the Zagreb Indoors and the Grand Prix Hassan II.

In November 2013 Polášek retired from professional tennis at the age of 28 due to nerve issues and loose discs in his back.

2018: Return to tennis 
Several years after retirement and allowing his body to heal through less strenuous activities such as coaching tennis and ski touring, Polášek hit with Mike Bryan and started playing some club matches again, and the pain of his previous injuries didn't seem to be reoccurring. He asked to take some time off from the coaching academy he taught at and started playing some futures and then challengers. By the end of September 2019 Polášek's doubles ranking had risen to within the top 200 for the first time in five years.

2019: First Masters 1000 title and Grand Slam semifinal 
Polášek claimed his first ATP title in 6 years in Kizbühel, partnering with Philipp Oswald. At Wimbledon he reached his first Grand Slam semifinal partnering with Ivan Dodig in just their second tournament together. They then went on to capture their first Masters 1000 title as a team, and Polášek's first career masters title at the Western & Southern Open in Cincinnati defeating Juan Sebastian Cabal and Robert Farah in the final 4–6, 6–4, 10–6.

Polášek and Dodig then went on to take their second title as a team defeating defending champions Lukasz Kubot and Marcelo Melo to take the China Open title in Beijing.

2020: Second Grand Slam semifinal, World No. 7 in doubles 
Dodig and Polášek began their 2020 season at the Adelaide International, where they reached the final, losing to Maximo Gonzalez and Fabrice Martin. 

They then reached the semifinals of the 2020 Australian Open before being defeated by Max Purcell and Luke Saville. As a result he reached a new career-high doubles ranking of World No. 7 on 3 February 2020.

After this the ATP Tour was suspended due to the COVID-19 pandemic. On the tour's resumption in August at the Cincinnati Masters in New York and at the US Open they fell in the first round.

2021: Historic and first Grand Slam title at the Australian Open 
Polášek and his partner Dodig reached the final of their first tournament in 2021 at the Antalya Open, where they lost to Nikola Mektic and Mate Pavic. After two weeks quarantine in Australia, they reached the semifinals of the Great Ocean Road Open, where they lost out to Jamie Murray and Bruno Soares. Continuing to partner with Dodig, Polášek won his first Grand Slam tournament at the Australian Open defeating Rajeev Ram and Joe Salisbury in the final. With the title he became the first Slovak male Grand Slam champion. As a result, he returned to the top 10 on 22 February 2021.

Significant finals

Grand Slam tournament finals

Doubles: 1 (1 title)

Masters 1000 finals

Doubles: 2 (2 titles)

ATP career finals

Doubles: 35 (17 titles, 18 runners-up)

Challenger and Futures finals

Singles: 3 (1–2)

Doubles: 54 (33–21)

Doubles performance timeline 

Current through the 2022 Davis Cup.

References

External links
 
 
 
 
 
 

Slovak male tennis players
1985 births
Living people
Sportspeople from Zvolen
Tennis players at the 2020 Summer Olympics
Olympic tennis players of Slovakia